Zav is a state of ritual impurity in Torah terminology. Zav may also refer to:

Zav-e Bala, a village in Iran
Zav-e Pain, a village in Iran
Zaav, a mythical Iranian king